= Fátima Pinto (musician) =

Costa Rican singer-songwriter

- Born: Fátima Pinto Jirón; December 24, 1999 (age 26); San José, Costa Rica
- Genres: Latin Pop; Urban Pop; Electronic Pop; Reggaeton
- Occupations: Singer; Songwriter
- Instruments: Voice, piano
- Years active: 2017–present
- Labels: Virgin Music México (Universal Music Group); Vibras TMC

Fátima Pinto (born December 24, 1999) is a Costa Rican singer-songwriter. She is recognized as one of the emerging Latin pop artists from Central America, and was named Spotify's Radar Artist for Central America and the Caribbean in 2021.

== Early life ==
Pinto was born on December 24, 1999, in San José. She began taking piano lessons at the age of three and starting writing songs and melodies from a young age. She is the daughter of Raul Pinto, vice-president of Liga Deportiva Alajuelense, and Trilce Jiron, who also serves as her manager. Her grandmother is Costa Rican actress Cecilia Garcia.

== Career ==
=== Beginnings and Feel Something (2017–2020) ===
Pinto launched her recording career officially in April 2017 with her debut single "Feel Something" (featuring Mike Joseph), produced by Vibras The Music Company. The track reached number one on Spotify's charts in Costa Rica and entered charts in Colombia.

Shortly after its release, Pinto was selected as the opening act for several major international concerts in Costa Rica, including shows by Soy Luna, Ariana Grande, and the joint Ricky Martin and Maluma concert in 2017.

Between 2018 and 2020, Pinto released a series of singles including "No necesito," "Cuelga la llamada," "Pum Pum," and "No More," collaborating with Latin producers Mario Caceres and Yasmil Marrufo.

=== Virgin Music and international breakthrough (2021–2022) ===
In 2021, Pinto was selected as Spotify's Radar Artist for Central America and the Caribbean, a program that boosted her profile across Latin America. As part of the campaign, her image was displayed on a billboard in Times Square in New York City.

In August 2021, Pinto signed with Virgin Music Mexico, a label under Universal Music Group. She also attended the 19th Annual Latin Grammy Awards in Las Vegas, Nevada.

Her debut under Virgin Music, "Algo mas" (2021), incorporated elements of EDM, Latin house, and electronic pop.

In October 2022, Pinto released her debut album Fatima's Disc, featuring collaborations with artists Kavvo, Kobi Cantillo, and Chucky 73. The album spans reggaeton, urban pop, electronic pop, and ballads. She also debuted in Maxim Australia magazine that same year.

=== Amor Fati EP (2024) ===
In January 2024, Pinto released her EP Amor Fati, a pop project described as a reflection on personal growth and self-love.

== Discography ==
=== Albums ===
Year	Title	Label
2022	Fatima's Disc	Virgin Music México

=== Extended plays ===
Year	Title	Label
2024	Amor Fati	—

=== Selected singles ===
Year	Title	Notes
2017	"Feel Something" (feat. Mike Joseph)	Debut single; produced by Vibras TMC
2017	"Belong Together"	—
2020	"Pum Pum"	—
2020	"No More"	—
2021	"Algo más"	First single under Virgin Music México
2022	"Devoto" (feat. Kavvo)	Lead single from Fatima's Disc
2023	"Amor de Esos"	—
